László Domokos (born 26 February 1965) is a Hungarian politician, member of the National Assembly (MP) for Szarvas (Békés County Constituency V) from 1998 to 2010.

He became President of the State Audit Office, as a result he resigned from his parliamentary seat on 4 July 2010. He was replaced by Béla Dankó after a by-election.

Personal life
He is married. He has a daughter.

References

1965 births
Living people
Hungarian economists
Fidesz politicians
Members of the National Assembly of Hungary (1998–2002)
Members of the National Assembly of Hungary (2002–2006)
Members of the National Assembly of Hungary (2006–2010)
Members of the National Assembly of Hungary (2010–2014)
People from Békéscsaba